Ole Valdemar Henrik Berntsen (22 January 1915 – 26 May 1996) was a Danish sailor. He competed in the dragon class at the 1948, 1952, 1956 and 1964 Olympics and placed third, fifth, second and first, respectively. His brothers Carl and William were also Olympic sailors. William competed alongside Ole in 1948 and 1952.

References

External links
 
 
 
 

1915 births
1996 deaths
Danish male sailors (sport)
Olympic sailors of Denmark
Olympic gold medalists for Denmark
Olympic silver medalists for Denmark
Olympic bronze medalists for Denmark
Olympic medalists in sailing
Sailors at the 1948 Summer Olympics – Dragon
Sailors at the 1952 Summer Olympics – Dragon
Sailors at the 1956 Summer Olympics – Dragon
Sailors at the 1964 Summer Olympics – Dragon
Medalists at the 1964 Summer Olympics
Medalists at the 1956 Summer Olympics
Medalists at the 1948 Summer Olympics
Hellerup Sejlklub sailors
Burials at Hellerup Cemetery